Bogonam-Foulbé is a village in the Kongoussi Department of Bam Province in northern Burkina Faso. It has a population of 205.

References

Populated places in the Centre-Nord Region
Bam Province